IRIB Nasim (شبكه نسیم, Shibkâh-e Nusim, in Persian), is an Islamic Republic of Iran Broadcasting television channel, broadcast in Worldwide.

The channel is one of the newer television channels in Iran and was launched on September 17, 2013 as a test airing only in Tehran, which officially established on May 7, 2014 and began airing nationally on December 24, 2014. The channel's a Free To Air 24-hour-a-day broadcast includes Fun And Entertainment Programs .

TV programs
Khandevane
Dorehami
 Abrang (Watercolor)
 Haavang (Pestle)
 Shabi Ba Abdi
 Shekar Abad
 Vitamin Kh
 Na-Sim-Khardar (No-Barb-Wire)
 Dast Nazan Jizze (Don't Touch, It Hurts)
 Dast be Naghd (Criticizing)
 Dobare Goush Kon (Listen Again)
 Chand Daraje (Some Degree)
 Ketab Baz (Open Book) 
 Hoosh e Bartar (Superior intelligence)
 ShabKook (Night-tuned)
 BiSim (Wireless)
Dast andaz (bumpiness)

TV Drama
 Halat e Khas (Special Case) (2016)
 In Way of Home (2017)

External links

IRIB TV Nasim Live streaming

Television stations in Iran
Persian-language television stations
Islamic Republic of Iran Broadcasting
Television channels and stations established in 1994
Mass media in Tehran
Free-to-air
1994 establishments in Iran